Viktor Damjanić (born 3 November 2005) is a Croatian footballer who plays for Šibenik as a defender.

Club career
On 7 November 2021 he played his first match for Šibenik, coming on as a substitute for Niko Rak in the 85th minute in a match against Rijeka. At the age of 16 years and 4 days he became the second youngest player in Croatian First Football League history.

International career
Damjanić has played internationally for Croatia at under-17 level.

References

External links
 

2005 births
Living people
Sportspeople from Šibenik
Association football defenders
Croatian footballers
Croatia youth international footballers
HNK Šibenik players
Croatian Football League players